Jay Acovone (born August 20, 1955) is an American actor. Among his most famous roles is Charles Kawalsky in the TV series Stargate SG-1.

Personal life

Acovone was born in New York City. His family later moved to Mahopac, New York where his parents owned a dry-cleaning business.

Career
Acovone has over 100 credits to his name spanning four decades of work in film and television. His television appearances include Search for Tomorrow as Brian Emerson; Beauty and the Beast where he played D.A. Joe Maxwell over the show's three season run; and Hollywood Beat. In a connection to his Beauty and the Beast co-star Linda Hamilton, he can be seen playing the officer pulling over the TX Terminator in Terminator 3.

In 2016, he acted in the motion capture video game Mafia III (2K Games), playing the role of an Italian Mafia boss, Sal Marcano.

Filmography

Movies

Television

Video games

References

External links 
 
"Jay Acovone" - profile on Industry Central

1955 births
American people of Italian descent
American male film actors
American male television actors
Male actors from New York (state)
People from Mahopac, New York
Living people
20th-century American male actors